is a role-playing video game for the Nintendo 64. It was released in 1999 in Japan only.

The gameplay is similar to Pokémon in that it shares the same concept of catching monsters. Your character finds a monster and raises it to battle evil. The towns are presented in a top down view. The houses, inns, bars, dungeons and shops are fixed points you can put a cursor over. The battle system features a bar of musical notes that the player uses to command the monsters. You can carry up to four monsters at a time.

Story 
The lush green land had nurtured many lives. Humans and demons are just some of them. The demon beasts do not attack people unless their territory is invaded. Humans who know this have lived quietly in the walled city and coexisted with the demon beasts. That is the relationship between humans and demons. However, it is said that there are some who love the demon beasts and adventure together as friends. People call them demon masters and watch over them with curiosity and a little respect. A little demon master boy is born and begins his adventure.

Characters

Leo (レオ) 
Leo is the main character. He lives in a "children's house" in the Renoul commune. He is 10 years old. He has a bright and positive personality. His encounter with Bernie, the demon beast, is an opportunity to go on an adventure as a demon master.

Bernie (バーニィ) 
A demon beast that Leo met in the woods. It seems to be a very rare race, and it has a strong bond with Leo.

Schutz (シュッツ) 
A young man caring for orphans in the "children's house". He is a solid person with a strong sense of responsibility for companionship, and also has a good understanding of Leo. He is a substitute for the children's brothers and fathers.

Carolyn (キャロリン) 
A woman taking care of orphans in the "children's house" with Schutz. She's gentle and a substitute for the children's sisters and mothers.

Joyce (ジョイス) 
A boy the same age as Leo who lives in the "children's house". Believing that Leo was cherished and favoured by Schutz and Carolyn, he was stubbornly cold to Leo, but later warmed to him.

Pook & Char (プック&チャル) 
Younger children who look up to Leo and live in the "children's house". They love Bernie.

Roche (ロシュ) 
A rich man who lives in Renoul and has a collection of rare monsters. Knowing of Bernie's existence, he tries to add it to his collection.

Matt & Mitt (マット&ミット) 
Roche's subordinates. They try to capture Bernie but they are not hostile to Leo. Both of them are actually nice people.

Vence (ヴァンス) 
A boy who aims to become a first-class demon master, whom Leo met in the demon beast master village. He was taught with Leo under the Demon Beast Sennin, and later reunited with him as a powerful Demon Beast Master.

Demon Beast Sennin (魔獣仙人) 
He is rumored to be a god of demons who knows all about demons and can draw out 100% of their power. A polymath of the demon beast, he challenges Leo and teaches him the knowledge of the demon beast. His identity is completely unknown.

Flair (フレヤ) 
A girl who uses demons to fight demon hunters. She is 12 years old. She is a strong and unilateral person who is quite confident and does not let Leo get in the way. Initially, she rebelled without recognizing Leo as a demon master, but later she began to recognize Leo as a full-fledged demon master.

Mints (ミンツ) 
A former demon master who lives in the demon master village. A demon beast was robbed by a person who claims to be a demon beast expert. After having Leo recover the demon beast, a relationship of trust was created with Leo.

Lee (リー) 
A reticent demon master who supplies cacti, which are the ingredients of sake, to Moyane's tavern.

Doug (ダグ) 
Son of the mayor of Moyane. A devilish beast with a bent gut.

Guy (ガイ) 
A demon beast master who protects the "demon beast forest" from the demon beast hunters who hunt and collect demon beasts. Guy hated humans because he thought they would kidnap the demon beast and use it as they pleased, but after seeing the strong friendship and bond between Leo and Bernie, he began to believe in Leo.

Garner (ガーナー) 
A herbalist who runs the Garner Demon Beast Farm and a former Demon Beast Master. When he was working as a demon master, he built a ranch to give back the help of many demons.

Rachel (レイチェル) 
Garner's granddaughter, who respects her grandfather. Later, she started running an inn on the ranch for the demon beasts.

Bartholomew (バーソロミュー) 
A first-class demon master living in the city, he has reigned as the champion for 10 consecutive years in the monster fighting competition. Leo and him meet at Moyane's tavern, where he discovers Leo's talent. He is a virtuous person who is in a position of fear and respect.

Tioso (ティオーゾ) 
The boss of the demon beast hunter who is dying in various places. A sneaky man who will use any means to win.

Main staff 

 Executive Producers: Takeo Iijima (飯島健男), Takayuki Kamikura (神蔵孝之)
 Supervisors: Seiji Tashiro (田代成治), Shuichi Kuji (久次周一), Shunsuke Imamura (今村俊介)
 General Manager: Shohei Iida (飯田就平)
 Producer: Koichiro Sakurai (桜井甲一郎)
 Directors: Masahiro Uramoto (浦本昌宏), Takanori Kawanishi (河西貴則), Keiko Wada (和田慶子)
 Game design: Toshinori Kawakami (川上俊則)
 Main program: Hiroki Igarashi (五十嵐宏樹)
 Music & Sound: Ichiro Nemoto (根本一郎)
 Event data: Yoko Watanabe (渡辺曜子)
 Battle data: Maki Hirano (平野真希)
 Scenario: Natsuko Hayakawa (早川奈津子)
 Character design: Toshihiro Kubo (久保聡宏)
 Publicity: Koichiro Sakurai (桜井甲一郎), Takashi Yamauchi (山内貴志)

External links 
 Release information at GameFAQs

References

1999 video games
Imagineer games
Japan-exclusive video games
Nintendo 64 games
Nintendo 64-only games
Video games developed in Japan